The 2017 GEICO 500 was a Monster Energy NASCAR Cup Series race held on May 7, 2017, at Talladega Superspeedway in Lincoln, Alabama. Contested over 191 laps, extended from 188 laps due to overtime, on the 2.66 mile (4.28 km) superspeedway, it was the 10th race of the 2017 Monster Energy NASCAR Cup Series season. Ricky Stenhouse Jr. won the race, his first career Monster Energy NASCAR Cup Series win, while Jamie McMurray finished second and Kyle Busch finished third.

Report

Background

Talladega Superspeedway, formerly known as Alabama International Motor Speedway, is a motorsports complex located north of Talladega, Alabama. It is located on the former Anniston Air Force Base in the small city of Lincoln. A tri-oval, the track was constructed in 1969 by the International Speedway Corporation, a business controlled by the France family. Talladega is most known for its steep banking. The track currently hosts NASCAR's Monster Energy NASCAR Cup Series, Xfinity Series and Camping World Truck Series. Talladega is the longest NASCAR oval with a length of 2.66-mile-long (4.28 km) tri-oval like the Daytona International Speedway, which is a 2.5-mile-long (4.0 km).

Entry list

Practice

First practice

Final practice
Final practice session for Friday was cancelled due to rain.

Qualifying
Describing the thought of leading the field to green "nice," Stenhouse said his crew "worked really, really hard on these cars. Like I said earlier, Jimmy Fennig has done a great job on these speedway cars. This is cool. Doug Yates builds awesome horsepower. With his dad, Robert, not doing as well as we would like, it would be cool to dedicate this one to him and all the hard work that the engine shop does. Man, it’s a cool way to start the weekend. I’m ready to get to Sunday.

Qualifying results

Race

First stage
Ricky Stenhouse Jr. led the field to the green flag at 2:20 p.m. He led the first 14 laps before trash on his grille forced him to give up the lead to remove said trash, handing the lead to Brad Keselowski on lap 15. The first caution of the race flew on lap 17 when Kyle Larson, two laps after he made contact with the wall exiting Turn 2, thanks to an awkward push from teammate Jamie McMurray, suffered a right-front tire cut and slammed the wall in Turn 1. Ryan Newman opted not to pit and assumed the race lead, but pitted the following lap and handed the lead to Clint Bowyer.

The race restarted on lap 21. By lap 25, there were three lines battling for the lead. Kyle Busch rode a push from the top line to take the lead exiting Turn 2 on lap 28. Keselowski edged out Busch at the line to retake the lead on lap 34. Denny Hamlin made an unscheduled stop on lap 48 for a vibration. Teammates Daniel Suárez and Matt Kenseth attempted to pit with 3 to go, but did not make it onto pit road before the leader crossed the start/finish line for 2-to-go, at which point pit road is closed. As a result, they were issued pass-through penalties for "pitting too soon" (pitting when pit road is closed). Keselowski won the first stage as the second caution flew for the end of the stage on lap 55. Ty Dillon opted not to pit and assumed the lead, but pitted the following lap and the lead cycled to Hamlin.

Second stage
The race restarted on lap 62. Hamlin received a real challenge for the lead on lap 79 from teammate Busch and lost it to him on lap 81. The third caution flew the following lap when Reed Sorenson suffered a right-front tire blowout and slammed the wall in the tri-oval. He could not continue and went on to finish 40th.

The race restarted on lap 87. Bowyer edged out Newman at the line to retake the lead on lap 90. Hamlin edged out Bowyer at the line to retake the lead two laps later and drove on to win the second stage as the fourth caution flew for the end of the stage at lap 110. Kenseth opted not to pit and assumed the lead.

Final stage

The race restarted with 72 laps to go. From 70 to go to 65 to go, the lead changed five times: Hamlin (70), Keselowski (69), Hamlin (68), Keselowski (67) and Kevin Harvick (65). Jimmie Johnson took the lead with 59 to go. Harvick edged out Johnson at the line to retake the lead with 55 to go. Joey Logano took the lead exiting Turn 2 with 49 to go. A number of cars hit pit road under green with 45 to go. Logano pitted with 40 to go, handing the lead to Elliott Sadler. Sadler pitted the following lap and the lead cycled to Kyle Busch.

The fifth caution flew with 28 to go when Ryan Blaney was turned on the backstretch, by contact from Stenhouse, and collected the outside wall. Blaney made it back to the pits, but had heavy damage that could not be fixed within the 5-minute "crash clock", relegating him to a 39th-place finish.

The race restarted with 23 to go. With 20 to go, A. J. Allmendinger was giving Chase Elliott a push exiting Turn 2 when he turned Elliott's car up the track, triggering a multi-car wreck (known as "The Big One") and bringing out the sixth caution (which also brought out a 26-minute and 51-second red flag for cleanup). Contact from Logano's car lifted Elliott's car into the air, which then rode the steel barrier of the outside retaining wall before coming back down to the ground. Allmendinger's car was also turned upside down as a result of the 16-car wreck on the backstretch. Elliott said afterwards that Allmendinger apologized. "I don't know that it was really his fault, per se. He had a big run and he kind of got to my bumper and just happened to be in a bad spot coming up off the corner, skewed a little bit to my left rear. And when that happens, it just unloads these cars too much." Allmendinger said afterwards that he "barely tapped (Elliott). And then I tried to get off him but at that point it was too late. It was just one of those things battling for the lead. The plan kind of went. We waited at the back and started moving forward. I hated that happened, but it’s Talladega. I’m not a big fan of it, but if you’re up front and you’ve got a chance to go for it, racing happens I guess, here.”

The race restarted with 15 to go. Busch took back the lead on the restart and Dale Earnhardt Jr., who was running third, dropped off the pace due to a loose tire. Earnhardt said that the loose wheel "was pretty bad. We were about to wreck. And we were lucky to get to pit road and get it changed. The left rear tire come loose. We didn’t change it on the last stop but the glue build-up on the stud didn’t allow them to get the tire tight and it just kind of worked its way loose. We only had one nut tight when we come down pit road. It was real close to coming off." The seventh caution flew with 10 to go for Landon Cassill, who had broken a drive shaft and was unable to coast off the track.

The race restarted with seven to go. The eighth caution flew with three to go after Bowyer, on the inside of a three-wide battle, made contact with Chris Buescher, who then made contact with Newman. Newman spun toward the inside wall, and though he corrected the spin, he made heavy contact with the inside wall and was unable to continue.

Overtime
The race restarted in overtime with two to go. Busch and Stenhouse were side by side coming to the white flag, with Busch edging out Stenhouse, but Stenhouse took the lead exiting Turn 2 and held off McMurray and Busch to drive on to score the victory and his first Monster Energy NASCAR Cup Series win ever.

Post-race

Driver comments
Stenhouse said in victory lane that the win was "a long time coming. We’ve run really well here at Talladega. This is the closest race track to home. I got a lot of cheers riding around here today and the fans were awesome. We had a lot packed in here at Talladega and it felt old-school. Man, to finally get that win for Jack (Roush) and everyone on our team is really special.”

Jamie McMurray, who threaded the needle between Busch and Johnson exiting Turn 2 on the final lap and edged Busch at the line to claim a runner-up finish, said "it’s really circumstantial as to what the guys do in front of you and what is happening behind you. I just got a run at the right time. I thought the No. 17 (Stenhouse) was going to get a little bit further out, but when we were coming to the line it just seemed like his car wasn’t going at that point, so it was a good finish. It was a great race. I’m glad everybody is okay, that was a really scary wreck on the backstretch, but really good day for our McDonald’s Chevrolet. We had good pit stops and the guys did a great job.”

Busch, who led a race high of 48 laps on his way to a third-place finish, said Stenhouse "got a run from behind off Turn 2, and I don't know what his help was or anything like that but he actually ran into the back of me, and then you'd think that that momentum would propel me forward some, and he just turned left and went right by. That was pretty impressive, I guess -- or I was just that slow and in his way. We did all we could here today and it's all circumstantial on how you win these things. Unfortunately our circumstances didn't quite go our way, but we go to a real race track (Kansas) next week and we'll try to win there."

Race results

Stage results

Stage 1
Laps: 55

Stage 2
Laps: 55

Final stage results

Stage 3
Laps: 81

Race statistics
 Lead changes: 14 among different drivers
 Cautions/Laps: 8 for 33
 Red flags: 1 for 26 minutes and 51 seconds
 Time of race: 3 hours, 29 minutes and 16 seconds
 Average speed:

Media

Television
Fox Sports covered their 17th race at the Talladega Superspeedway. Mike Joy, six-time Talladega winner – and all-time restrictor plate race wins record holder – Jeff Gordon and four-time Talladega winner Darrell Waltrip called the race in the booth for the race. Jamie Little, Chris Neville, Vince Welch and Matt Yocum handled the action on pit road for the television side.

Radio
MRN had the radio call for the race which was also simulcast on Sirius XM NASCAR Radio. Joe Moore, Jeff Striegle and Rusty Wallace called the race in the booth when the field raced through the tri-oval. Dave Moody called the race from the Sunoco spotters stand outside turn 2 when the field raced through turns 1 and 2. Mike Bagley called the race from a platform inside the backstretch when the field raced down the backstretch. Kyle Rickey called the race from the Sunoco spotters stand outside turn 4 when the field raced through turns 3 and 4. Alex Hayden, Winston Kelley, Kim Coon, and Steve Post worked pit road for the radio side.

Standings after the race

Drivers' Championship standings

Manufacturers' Championship standings

Note: Only the first 16 positions are included for the driver standings.
. – Driver has clinched a position in the Monster Energy NASCAR Cup Series playoffs.

References

GEICO 500
GEICO 500
GEICO 500
NASCAR races at Talladega Superspeedway